Paula Ormaechea was the defending champion, having won the event in 2013, but decided to compete at the Internazionali BNL d'Italia instead.

Danka Kovinić won the tournament, defeating Pauline Parmentier in the final, 6–1, 6–2.

Seeds

Main draw

Finals

Top half

Bottom half

References 
 Main draw

Open Saint-Gaudens Midi-Pyrénées - Singles